Hugh James Foss (25 June 1848 – 24 March 1932) was an Anglican bishop, the second  Bishop of Osaka.

Hugh James Foss was born into a legal family: his father was Edward Foss, author of The Judges of England. He was educated at Marlborough College and Christ's College, Cambridge. Ordained in 1873,  he spent a three-year curacy in Liverpool before emigrating to Kobe three years later. He spent the rest of his ministry there, amongst other achievements translating The Imitation of Christ by Thomas à Kempis into the vernacular. He died on 24 March 1932.

Foss married, 24 July 1901 in Kobe, Lina Janet Ovans, daughter of John Lambert Ovans, of Surrey. His son Hugh Foss was a cryptanalyst for the Government Code and Cypher School at Bletchley Park during the Second World War where he headed the Japanese section. Another son, Charles Calveley Foss was awarded the Victoria Cross in the First World War.

Notes

1848 births
People educated at Marlborough College
Alumni of Christ's College, Cambridge
Anglican Church in Japan
1932 deaths
British expatriates in Japan
English–Japanese translators
Anglican bishops of Osaka